Osmaneli is a town in Bilecik Province in the Marmara region of Turkey. It is the seat of Osmaneli District. Its population is 16,192 (2021). The mayor is Münür Şahin. Its neighbours are Pamukova from north, Geyve from north-east, Gölpazarı from south-east, Bilecik from south, Yenişehir from south-west and İznik from west.

Situated on a hillside at a point where the Karasu, flowing down from Kandilli Dağ, enters the Sakarya, this small town was known in antiquity as Leukai and more recently as Lefke. South of the town is a narrow and very beautiful river gorge with rocky walls up to 100 m/328 ft high, contributing to some spectacular scenery.

Places to see

In the west part of Osmaneli is the well-preserved ruins of a large Rum (Anatolian Greek) Orthodox church of the 1890s not far from it, a building that was used as a silk-spinning mill, and also the owner's house. There are several Ottoman-style homes available and watermelon festivals each year being celebrated, which is also worth seeing.

Osmaneli was a significant midpoint in the era of Byzantium and Ottoman Empires, and all armies have walked through this point during their expeditions. Osmaneli was a town, where Turks and Rums have lived together until the War of Independence. The only structure in Osmaneli left from such Rums, was a church, named Aya Yorgi, located on Cumhuriyet Avenue. It is understood from the archived documents that this 19th-century structure had passed through several different construction cycles. It is written in detail in those documents that the first structure had a basilica type crushed wooden roof, and following the privileges granted to Greek people as a result of Royal Edict of Reform, the current plan was implemented. This plan, in the shape of a Greek cross, currently does not have the top cover. The most remarkable point of the structure is the towers on both sides of the entrance, on the western side. These towers, covered with small domes, are used not only for climbing to the second floor but also as bell towers. Such type of twin towers at western sides of the buildings is common until the first years following Christ. These towers, which can also be seen in early Byzantium era churches, have also been integral parts of Romanic, Gothic, and Baroque cathedrals in European architecture since the days of the Carolingian Empire. It is also possible to see in Greek churches of the 19th century located in Istanbul and Anatolia during the Ottoman Empire that such towers were being used for the same functions and in the same shapes as they were being used in Europe. The most beautiful representative of this trend is this Greek Church in Osmaneli.

References

External links
Osmaneli municipality's official website 

Populated places in Bilecik Province
Towns in Turkey
Osmaneli District